The 2011 Nevada Wolf Pack football team represented the University of Nevada, Reno in the 2011 NCAA Division I FBS football season. The Wolf Pack were led by Chris Ault in his 27th overall and 8th straight season since taking over as head coach for the third time in 2004. They played their home games at Mackay Stadium and were members of the Western Athletic Conference (WAC). They finished the season 7–6 and 5–2 in WAC play to finish in a tie for second place. They were invited to their seventh straight bowl game, the Hawaii Bowl, where they lost to Southern Miss by 17 to 24.

This was the Wolf Pack's last year as a member of the WAC as they joined the Mountain West Conference for the 2012 season.

Schedule

Rankings

Personnel

Game summaries

at Oregon

at San Jose State

at Texas Tech

at Boise State

UNLV

New Mexico

Fresno State

at New Mexico State

Hawaii

Louisiana Tech

at Utah State

Idaho

vs. Southern Miss (Hawaii Bowl)

Players in the 2012 NFL Draft

References

Nevada
Nevada Wolf Pack football seasons
Nevada Wolf Pack football